Zona Maco is an art fair organized since 2003 that takes place biannually during February and September in Mexico City. The fair comprises three events: Zona Maco Arte Contemporáneo showcases contemporary and modern artworks and design, Zona Maco Foto features vintage, modern and contemporary photography and video, and Salón del Anticuario hosts antiquarians. In addition, the fair offers a program of lectures and activities in museums, galleries and exhibition sites across Mexico City. El País named it the largest art fair in Latin America.

Editions 

 Zona Maco México Arte Contemporáneo Contemporary Art Mexico | 2009 - 2016, Centro Banamex, Mexico City
 Zona Maco Foto | 2015- 2016, Centro Banamex, Mexico City
 Zona Maco Salón del Anticuario Antiquarian Hall | 2014 - 2016, Centro Banamex, Mexico City
 Feria Internacional de Arte Contemporáneo en México International Contemporary Art Fair in Mexico | 2008, Centro Banamex, Mexico City
 Maco México Arte Contemporáneo Contemporary Art Mexico | 2007, Residencial Palmas Park, Mexico City
 Maco México Arte Contemporáneo Contemporary Art Mexico | 2004 - 2006, Expo Reforma, Mexico City
 La Muestra 2 | 2003, World Trade Center, Mexico City
 La Muestra 1 | 2002, Monterrey, Mexico

Zona Maco Arte Contemporáneo 

Zona Maco México Arte Contemporáneo features five sections
 General Section, New Proposals, Zona Maco Sur, Modern Art and Zona Maco MACO Design, gathering together international curators, artists, gallery owners and collectors.

Curators and selection committees 

Zona Maco Arte Contemporáneo 2016 
 General Section: Stefania Bortolami (Bortolami Gallery], New York), Ben Loveless (Galleri Nordenhake, Stockholm / Berlin ) and Patricia Ortiz Monasterio (Galería OMR, Mexico City)
 New Proposals: Humberto Moro (Guadalajara, 1982)
 Zona Maco Sur: João Mourão (Alegrete, Portugal, 1975) and Luis Silva (Lisbon, Portugal, 1978), co-directors at the Kunsthalle Lissabon (Lisbon)
 Modern Art: Alejandra Yturbe (Galería de Arte Mexicano, Mexico City), Mariana Pérez Amor (Galería de Arte Mexicano, Mexico City) and Enrique Guerrero (Galería Enrique Guerrero, Mexico City).
 Zona Maco Design: Cecilia León de la Barra (Mexico City, 1975)

Zona Maco FOTO 2016
 Patricia Conde (Director of  Patricia Conde, Galería, Mexico City), Ana Elena Mallet (independent curator, Mexico City) and Mauricio Maillé (Director of Visual Arts at Fundación Televisa, Mexico City).

Salón del Anticuario 2016
 Daniel Liebsohn (Mexico City), Mario Uvence (Tuxtla Gutiérrez, Chiapas), Luis Alegría (Portugal), Juan Manuel Corrales (Curator of the International Baroque Museum, Puebla), Leonor Cortina (President of the Casa la Bola Museum Patronage, Mexico City) and Héctor Rivero Borrell (Director of the Franz Mayer Museum, Mexico City).

Founder 

Zélika García founded Zona Maco Arte Contemporáneo in 2003, Salón del Anticuario in 2014 and Zona Maco Foto in 2015. García is currently serving as Director, while Daniel Garza Usabiaga serves as Artistic Director.

References

Art fairs
Annual events in Mexico
Culture in Mexico City